Euryparasitus emarginatus is a species of mite in the family Ologamasidae. It is found in Europe.

References

Ologamasidae
Articles created by Qbugbot
Animals described in 1839